Major-General Henry Rodolph Davies,  (21 September 1865 – 4 January 1950) was a British Army officer, who commanded the 11th (Northern) Division during the First World War.

Military career
He was born in 1865, the younger son of Henry Fanshawe Davies, an army officer who would later rise to the rank of Lieutenant-General. His grandfather was General Francis John Davies (died 1878) and his great-grandfather was Admiral of the Fleet Sir Thomas Byam Martin. The family seat was Elmley Castle, Pershore, Worcestershire. His elder brother was General Sir Francis Davies). Henry junior was educated at Eton, where he was proficient in Oriental languages.

Davies joined the Army, and was sent to British-controlled Burma in 1887 and to Siam in 1892. In 1893 he was attached to a survey unit which surveyed the passes between Burma and China which located the Crouching Tiger Pass, the Heavenly Horse Pass and the Han Dragon Pass. On completion of the team's objectives Davies remained in China to explore the Yunnan area. On his return to England he was asked to survey a potential railway route from India to the Yangtze river via Yunnan and in 1898 returned to Burma. By mid-1899 his team had travelled nearly 2,500 miles of the proposed route, mapping the terrain in detail. He wrote a book about his experiences and in 1906 was awarded the Royal Geographical Society's Murchison Award.

He was involved in the Tirah Campaign (1897–98), where he was mentioned in despatches, the Boxer Rebellion (1900), and the Second Boer War (1901–1902). In 1911 he was promoted to Lieutenant-Colonel and ordered back to Britain to take command of the 2nd Battalion, Oxfordshire and Buckinghamshire Light Infantry.

On the outbreak of the First World War, the 2nd Battalion was at Aldershot and was mobilised as part of the 5th Brigade, 2nd Division, in the Expeditionary Force. Davies remained in command of the battalion through the first campaigns on the Western Front, until promoted to take command of the 3rd Brigade in 1915. He remained with the brigade until transferred to the 33rd Brigade in the 11th (Northern) Division in 1917. In May of that year, after Major-General Archibald Ritchie was wounded, Davies took command of the division; he commanded it until the Armistice and relinquished command when it was demobilised in 1919. During the war, he was mentioned in dispatches eight times and rose from a Lieutenant-Colonel to Major-General.

After the end of the war, he commanded the reformed 49th (West Riding) Division in the Territorial Army and retired in 1923. He was invested as a Companion of the Order of the Bath. He died in 1950.

References

Sources

|-

1865 births
1950 deaths
Military personnel from Worcestershire
People educated at Eton College
Oxfordshire and Buckinghamshire Light Infantry officers
Companions of the Order of the Bath
British Army generals of World War I
British Army personnel of the Second Boer War
British Army major generals
Recipients of the MacGregor Medal